Ngaya Club de Mdé is a football club from the Comoros based in Mdé.

Achievements
Comoros Premier League: 1
 2016
Comoros Cup: 0

Performance in CAF competitions
CAF Champions League: 1 appearance
2017 – Preliminary Round

CAF Confederation Cup: 0 appearance

Current Players

External links
Team profile - Soccerway.com

Football clubs in the Comoros